Mr. Mulliner is a fictional character from the short stories of P. G. Wodehouse. Mr. Mulliner is a loquacious pub raconteur who, no matter what the topic of conversation, can find an appropriate (if improbable) story about a member of his family to match it.

Like much of Wodehouse's work, the Mr. Mulliner stories were originally written for magazine publication. Thirty-seven of the 41 overall Mulliner stories were originally published between 1926 and 1937. The final four stories appeared much later, being published between 1958 and 1972.

Overview
Like his fellow Wodehouse character, the Oldest Member, the raconteur Mr. Mulliner can turn any conversation into a "recollection", or funny story. A habitué of the Angler's Rest pub, his fellow drinkers are identified only by their beverages. (Mr. Mulliner is a Hot Scotch and Lemon.) Wodehouse revealed in an introduction that he devised Mr. Mulliner after collecting notebooks full of ideas that could not be used because they were too outlandish, until he had the happy notion of a fisherman whose veracity could be doubted.

The tales of Mulliner all involve one of his relations: there are dozens upon dozens of cousins, nieces, and nephews.  These include stories about loves lost, found and rekindled; fortunes made and lost; and opportunities grasped or missed.  They take place across the globe: Los Angeles's Hollywood and the English Country House are the settings for many.

Two Mulliner stores ("Gala Night" and "The Rise of Minna Nordstrom") are not primarily about one of Mr. Mulliner's relatives. However, in these two cases, Mr. Mulliner states that the stories were told to him by relatives; he is therefore reporting a story told to him by a relation, rather than a story about a relation.

Stories
The Mulliner stories all employ an unusual structure. At the beginning of each story, an unnamed first-person narrator sets the scene at the Angler's Rest pub, describing the conversation at the bar-parlour. This will lead to Mr. Mulliner entering the conversation, generally elaborating on the conversational theme, and remarking that it reminds him of a story involving a relative. Then, no more than a page or two into the story, Mr. Mulliner effectively takes over the narration of the tale, describing the events that befell the relative in question. In the earlier stories, the unnamed first-person narrator returns very briefly to close out the tale back at the Angler's Rest—in later stories, the story ends when Mr. Mulliner has concluded it.

Mr. Mulliner himself is rarely a character in the tales he tells. An exception is the story "George and Alfred", in which Mr. Mulliner tries to help out one of his nephews who has been accused of a crime. In this story, we learn that Mr. Mulliner is a friend of Hollywood studio head Jacob Z. Schnellenhamer, and that he has stayed on Schnellenhamer's yacht while it was cruising the Mediterranean. We also learn that Mr. Mulliner's first name, whatever it may be, is not George.

Little else is revealed of Mulliner's character beyond his large family, his choice of beverage, and his hobby of fishing (which he mentions in one story replaced his earlier hobby of golf). Nevertheless, Mulliner narrates forty short stories.  Many are collected in the three books, containing nine stories each, which bear his name:

 Meet Mr Mulliner (1927)
 Mr Mulliner Speaking (1929)
 Mulliner Nights (1933)

The remaining fourteen stories are scattered in other volumes:

 Five in Blandings Castle and Elsewhere (1935)
 Three in Young Men in Spats (1936)
 One in Lord Emsworth and Others (1937) (US title: Crime Wave at Blandings) 
 One in Eggs, Beans and Crumpets (1940)
 Two in A Few Quick Ones (1959)
 One in Plum Pie (1966)
 One in The World of Mr Mulliner (1972) 

The World of Mr Mulliner is an omnibus containing all 41 stories narrated by Mr. Mulliner. It also includes one other story which has a tangential connection to the series:  "From a Detective's Notebook" (1959) is narrated by the detective Adrian Mulliner, who had previously been established as one of Mr. Mulliner's innumerable nephews. Strictly speaking, despite its appearance in the Mr. Mulliner omnibus, this tale cannot be considered a Mr. Mulliner story, as Mr. Mulliner does not narrate it, appear in it, and is not actually referenced in it in any way. 

Another story tangentially connected to the series is the very short Mulliner story entitled "Shock Dogs", which was not published in any story collection. The story was published in the 14 February 1940 issue of the British satirical magazine Punch and is not more than two pages long. It is signed with initials only (P.G.W.) but the Articles and Verse listing in the bound Punch volume CXCVIIJ Jan-June 1940 attributes the story to Wodehouse, P. G. It mentions by name Hitler, Brauchitsch, and Goebbels, which is very unusual for an author who so seldom allowed politics to impinge on his novels and stories.

Also note that a handful of what were to become "Mr. Mulliner stories" were originally published in magazines without the framework of Mr. Mulliner telling the story in question. (These include three stories about Bobbie Wickham, as well as one about James Rodman.) When revised for book publication, Wodehouse added the Mulliner openings and narration — and it is these revised versions which appear in all Mulliner and Wodehouse anthologies to this day. These revised stories can often be distinguished by Mulliner identifying the prime character of the story as a "distant cousin" (or some other far-flung relation) whose surname is not Mulliner.

Known relatives

Forebears:
 A Sieur de Moulinières "came over with the Conqueror", presumably in 1066.
 A Mulliner "once received the thanks of his Sovereign for services rendered on the field of Crecy". (The Battle of Crecy occurred in 1346.)

Grandmother:
 Unnamed.  Died in the late 19th century.  It is this grandmother who made William (below) pledge to not drink until he turned 21—or 41, William can't quite remember which.

Uncles:
 William Mulliner, a businessman

Aunts:
 Myrtle Banks, married William

Brothers:
 Wilfred Mulliner, a chemist and inventor
 Sir Sholto Mulliner, M.V.O.
 Joseph Mulliner

Sisters-in-law:
 Angela Purdue, married Wilfred
 Lady Wilhelmina Mulliner, widow of Sir Sholto

First cousins:
 John San Francisco Earthquake Mulliner, son of William and Myrtle
 (unnamed brother of above)
 Clarence Mulliner, photographer
 Cedric Mulliner
 Lady Wickham, novelist under the pen-name "George Masterman"
 Edward Mulliner
 Rupert Mulliner
 Egbert Mulliner, civil servant

Cousins by marriage:
Gladys Biggs, married Clarence
Myrtle Watling, married Cedric
Sir Cuthbert Wickham, married Lady Wickham

First cousins, once removed:
 Roberta "Bobbie" Wickham, daughter of Sir Cuthbert and Lady Wickham
 Lancelot Mulliner, an artist, Edward's son
 Mervyn Mulliner
 Anselm Mulliner, a curate, Rupert's son
 (unnamed older brother of Anselm)

First cousin, once removed, by marriage:
 Gladys Bingley, married Lancelot

Distant cousins:
 James Rodman, mystery novelist
 Agnes Flack, championship golfer and "daughter of a distant cousin"
 Montrose Mulliner, Assistant Director of the Perfecto-Zizzbaum Motion Picture Corp. of Hollywood
 Wilmot Mulliner, a "nodder" at Perfecto-Zizzbaum

Distant cousins by marriage:
 Sidney George McMurdo, insurance executive and scratch golfer; marries Agnes
 Rosalie Beamish, marries Montrose 
 Mabel Potter, a private secretary and ex-bird imitator in Vaudeville; marries Wilmot

Nephews:

Note that Mr. Mulliner has three nephews named George, all different people.

 George Mulliner, a stammerer and crossword puzzle enthusiast
 Ferdinand Mulliner, studying at Eton (older son of Wilfred and Angela) 
 Percival Mulliner, at preparatory school in Sussex (younger son of Wilfred and Angela) 
 Augustine Mulliner, a curate (later a vicar)
 (name unknown), a student at Harchester, younger brother of Augustine
 Lancelot Bassington Mulliner, an aspiring poet
 Osbert Mulliner, a jade collector
 Frederick Mulliner
 Dr. George Mulliner, brother of Frederick
 Archibald Mulliner, member of the Drones Club, son of Sir Sholto and Lady Wilhelmina, and a skilled chicken-impersonator
 Ignatius Mulliner, portrait painter and ukulele player
 Mordred Mulliner, a poet
 Adrian Mulliner, a detective
 Sacheverell Mulliner
 Eustace Mulliner, works at the Swiss Embassy
 Egbert Mulliner, assistant editor of The Weekly Booklover
 Cyril Mulliner, interior decorator
 Bulstrode Mulliner, screenwriter in Hollywood
 Brancepeth Mulliner, an artist
 Augustus Mulliner
 Reginald Mulliner, inheritor of a substantial sum of money
 George Mulliner, screenwriter in Hollywood, identical twin of Alfred
 Alfred Mulliner, professional conjurer known as the Great Alfredo, identical twin of George

Nephews by marriage:
 Aubrey Bassinger, married Charlotte

Nieces:
 Charlotte Mulliner, a poet

Nieces by marriage:
 Aurelia Cammerleigh, married Archibald
 Annabella Spockett-Sprockett, married Mordred
 Hermione Rossiter, married Ignatius
 Mabel Petherick-Soames, married Osbert 
 Evangeline Pembury, novelist, married Egbert
 Amelia Bassett, married Cyril 
 Jane, married Augustine
 Hermione Brimble, married Augustus
 Jane Oliphant, married Frederick
 Lady Millicent Shipton-Bellinger, married Adrian
 Muriel Branksome, married Sacheverell
 Susan Blake, married George (her fellow crossword puzzle enthusiast)

Nature of relationship uncertain:
 Theophilus Mulliner, the bishop of Bognor

Original appearances

 "The Truth about George"
 U.K.: Strand, July 1926
 U.S.: Liberty, 3 July 1926
 "A Slice of Life"
 U.K.: Strand, August 1926
 U.S.: Liberty, 7 August 1926
 "Mulliner's Buck-U-Uppo"
 U.K.: Strand, November 1926
 U.S.: Liberty, 4 September 1926
 "The Romance of a Bulb-Squeezer"
 U.K.: Strand, March 1927
 U.S.: Liberty, 12 March 1927
 "The Story of William"
 U.K.: Strand, May 1927
 U.S.: Liberty, 9 April 1927 (as "It Was Only a Fire")
 "Those in Peril on the Tee"
 UK: Strand, June 1927
 US: Liberty, 21 May 1927
Original UK version is narrated by the Oldest Member, not Mr. Mulliner.
 "Came the Dawn"
 U.K.: Strand, July 1927
 U.S.: Liberty, 11 June 1927
 "The Bishop's Move"
 U.K.: Strand, September 1927
 U.S.: Liberty, 20 August 1927
 "Portrait of a Disciplinarian"
 U.K.: Strand, October 1927
 U.S.: Liberty, 24 September 1927
 "Honeysuckle Cottage"
Initially published without Mr. Mulliner framework
 U.K.: Strand, February 1925
 U.S.: Saturday Evening Post, 24 January 1925
Subsequently, rewritten. First appearance as a Mr. Mulliner story in Meet Mr. Mulliner, September 1927
 "The Reverent Wooing of Archibald"
 UK: Strand, August 1928
 US: Cosmopolitan, September 1928
 "The Ordeal of Osbert Mulliner"
 UK: Strand, December 1928
 US: Liberty, 24 November 1928
 "Unpleasantness at Bludleigh Court"
 UK: Strand, February 1929
 US: Liberty, 2 February 1929
 "The Man Who Gave Up Smoking"
 UK: Strand, March 1929
 US: Liberty, 23 March 1929
 "The Story of Cedric"
 UK: Strand, May 1929
 US: Liberty, 11 May 1929
 "Something Squishy"
Initially published without Mr. Mulliner framework
 UK: Strand, January 1925
 US: Saturday Evening Post, 20 December 1924
Subsequently, rewritten. First appearance as a Mr. Mulliner story in Mr. Mulliner Speaking, April 1929
 "The Awful Gladness of the Mater"
Initially published without Mr. Mulliner framework
 UK: Strand, May 1925
 US: Saturday Evening Post, 21 March 1925
Subsequently, rewritten. First appearance as a Mr. Mulliner story in Mr. Mulliner Speaking, April 1929
 "The Passing of Ambrose"
Initially published without Mr. Mulliner framework
 UK: Strand, July 1928
 US: Cosmopolitan, August 1928
Subsequently, rewritten. First appearance as a Mr. Mulliner story in Mr. Mulliner Speaking, April 1929
 "Gala Night"
 UK: Strand, June 1930
 US:  Cosmopolitan, May 1930
 "Best Seller"
Early version published without Mr. Mulliner framework as "Parted Ways"
 UK: Strand, December 1914 
 US: Pictorial Review, June 1915
Subsequently, rewritten. First appearance as a Mr. Mulliner story: 
 UK: Strand, July 1930 
 US: Cosmopolitan, June 1930
 "The Knightly Quest of Mervyn"
 UK: Strand, July 1931 (as "Quest")
 US: Cosmopolitan, April 1931 (as "Quest")
 "The Voice from the Past"
 UK: Strand, December 1931
 US: American, November 1931
 "The Smile that Wins"
 UK: Strand, February 1932
 US: American, October 1931
 "Strychnine in the Soup"
 UK: Strand, March 1932
 US: American, December 1931 (as "The Missing Mystery")
 "The Story of Webster"
 UK: Strand, May 1932 (as "The Bishop's Cat")
 US: American, February 1932 
 "Cats will be Cats"
 UK: Strand, June 1932 (as "The Bishop's Folly")
 US: American, March 1932 (as "The Bishop's Folly")
 "Open House"
 UK: Strand, April 1932
 US: American, April 1932
 "Monkey Business"
 UK: Strand, December 1932
 US: American Magazine, December 1932 (as "A Cagey Gorilla")
 "The Nodder"
 UK: Strand, January 1933
 US: American Magazine, January 1933 (as "Love Birds")
 "The Juice of an Orange"
 UK: Strand, February 1933
 US: American Magazine, February 1933 (as "Love on a Diet")
 "The Rise of Minna Nordstrom"
 UK: Strand, April 1933
 US: American Magazine, March 1933 (as "A Star is Born")
 "The Castaways"
 UK: Strand, June 1933
 "The Fiery Wooing of Mordred" 
 US: Cosmopolitan, December 1934
 UK: Strand, February 1935
 "Archibald and the Masses" 
 US: Cosmopolitan, August 1935
 UK: Strand, February 1936
 "The Code of the Mulliners"
 US: Cosmopolitan, February 1935
 UK: Strand, April 1935
 "Buried Treasure"
 UK: Strand, September 1936
 US: This Week, 27 September 1936 (as "Hidden Treasure")
 "Anselm Gets His Chance" 
 US: Saturday Evening Post, 3 July 1937
 UK: Strand, July 1937
 "The Right Approach" 
Early version published without Mr. Mulliner framework as "Joy Bells For Barmy"
 US: Cosmopolitan, October 1947
Subsequently, rewritten. First appearance as a Mr. Mulliner story: 
 UK: Lilliput, September 1958
 US: Playboy, January 1959
 "Big Business"
Early version published without Mr. Mulliner framework
 US: Collier's, 13 December 1952 
 UK: Lilliput, March/April 1953 
Subsequently, rewritten. First appearance as a Mr. Mulliner story in the 1959 book A Few Quick Ones 
 "George and Alfred"
Early version published without Mr. Mulliner framework as "Rallying Round Old George"
UK: Strand Magazine, December 1912
US: Collier's Weekly, 27 September 1913 (as "Brother Alfred")
Subsequently, rewritten. First appearance as a Mr. Mulliner story: 
 US: Playboy, January 1967
 "Another Christmas Carol"
Early version published without Mr. Mulliner framework
 US: Playboy, December 1970
Subsequently, rewritten. First appearance as a Mr. Mulliner story in the 1972 book The World of Mr. Mulliner

Adaptations

Fourteen Mulliner stories were adapted for television as part of the 1974–1978 television series Wodehouse Playhouse, though Mr Mulliner himself only appeared in the pilot episode. In the episode, "The Reverent Wooing of Archibald", Mr Mulliner was portrayed by William Mervyn.

Richard Griffiths starred as Mr Mulliner in a series of radio adaptations of the stories, including six episodes in 2002 under the title Meet Mr Mulliner and four episodes in 2004 under the title More Mr Mulliner. The series aired on BBC Radio 4.

Notes

References

 
 
 

P. G. Wodehouse characters
Literary characters introduced in 1926
Series of books
Fictional storytellers
Fictional fishers
Male characters in literature